John Butler, 17th Earl of Ormonde, 10th Earl of Ossory (1740–1795) was an Irish peer and Member of Parliament (MP). He became a Protestant in 1764. He was an Irish MP, representing Gowran between 1776 and 1783, and Kilkenny City between 1783 and 1792. In 1791, his right to the peerage was acknowledged in the Irish House of Lords and he became the 17th Earl of Ormond.

Birth and origins 

John was born on 10 December 1740 at Garryricken. He was the only son, of Walter Butler and his wife Ellen Morres. At the time of his birth his father was the heir apparent of his father the esquire of Garryricken. In 1766 his father would become the de jure 16th Earl of Ormond. His father's family, the Butler ynasty, was Old English and descended from Theobald Walter, who had been appointed Chief Butler of Ireland by King Henry II in 1177.

John's mother was a daughter of Nicholas Morres of the Court, County Dublin, granddaughter of Sir John Morres, 7th Baronet Morres of Knockagh. John was one of four siblings, who are listed in his father's article.

Conforms and marries a Protestant heiress 
On 16 December 1764 he conformed to the established Church of Ireland in a ceremony performed in the church of Golden, County Tipperary. In other words: he became a Protestant.

In February 1769 he married Frances Susan Elizabeth Wandesford. also called Anne. She was a rich heiress being the only surviving child of John Wandesford the 1st Earl  Wandesford and 5th Viscount Castlecomer and his wife Agnes Southwell. The Wandesfords were Protestants and had supported the Prince of Orange during the Williamite War in Ireland. They owned land and coal mines around Castlecomer in northern County Kilkenny. His wife's mother belonged to a junior branch of the family of Viscount  Southwell. When the Earl of Wandesford died in 1784, his titles became extinct, but his estates passed to John Butler.

 
John and Anne (or Frances Susan Elizabeth) had three sons:
 Walter (1770–1820), who was in 1816 created Marquess of Ormonde
 James (1777–1838), who was in 1825 created Marquess of Ormonde after his brother's death
 Charles Harward (1781–1860), who married firstly Lady Sarah Butler, daughter of Henry Thomas Butler, 2nd Earl of Carrick and, secondly, Lucy French, daughter of Arthur French

—and two daughters:
 Eleanor (died 1859), who married Cornelius O'Callaghan, 1st Viscount Lismore (1775–1857) in 1808
 Elizabeth (died 1822), who married Thomas Kavanagh (1767–1837), The MacMorrough, in 1799

Two inheritances 
In 1783 his father died in Kilkenny Castle. John inherited Kilkenny and the lands, notably those that his father had inherited from John Butler of Kilcash, the de jure 15th Earl of Ormond, in 1766. In 1784 his father-in-law, the Earl of Wandesford died. His titles became extinct, but John inherited the land and the coal mines.

Earl 
In 1791 he claimed the title of Earl of Ormond, which was believed to have become extinct in 1715. The Irish House of Lords accepted this claim and he was restored to become the 17th Earl of Ormonde.

Death and succession 
Ormond, as he now wa, died on 25 or 30 December 1795 at Kilkenny Castle and was buried in Kilcash. His widow died in Dublin in 1830. He was succeeded by his son Walter, who was made a Marquess in 1816.

Notes and references

Notes

Citations

Sources 

 
 
  – The Southern Deanery
  – N to R (for Ormonde)
  – Scotland and Ireland
 
 
  – (for timeline)
  – Viscounts (for Butler, Viscount Mountgarret)

1740 births
1795 deaths
John
Earls of Ormond (Ireland)
Irish MPs 1776–1783
Irish MPs 1783–1790
Irish MPs 1790–1797
Members of the Parliament of Ireland (pre-1801) for County Kilkenny constituencies